Bright Side or The Bright Side may refer to:

The English language idiom "Look on the bright side"

Music
Bright Side, by OBB
The Bright Side (Lenka album), a 2015 album by Lenka
The Bright Side (Meiko album), a 2012 album by the singer Meiko
"Bright Side", song by Vicetone featuring Cosmos and Creature from Aurora

Other
Bright Side (YouTube channel), operated by TheSoul Publishing
The Bright Side (painting), an 1865 oil painting by Winslow Homer of three African American Union Army teamsters

See also
 Light side (disambiguation)
 Sunnyside (disambiguation)
 Dark side (disambiguation)
 Bright (disambiguation)
 Side (disambiguation)